Evergreen Middle School may refer to the following schools:

A school in the Everett School District in Washington state
A school in the Hillsboro School District in Oregon
A school in Jefferson County Public Schools